Touria Chaoui (Berber: ⵜⵓⵔⵉⴰ ⵛⴰⵡⵉ, Arabic: ثريا الشاوي; December 14, 1936, Fez, Morocco–March 1, 1956) was the first Moroccan female pilot.

Early life 

Chaoui was born on December 14, 1936, in Fez into an eminent Berber family. Her father, Abdelwahed Chaoui, was an avant-garde journalist and theatre director, her mother was named, Zina. She was one of two children, her brother Salah Chaoui is a renowned artist who resides in Vichy, France. In 1948, Touria's family moved from Fez to Casablanca to start a new life.

Career 

Touria's father enrolled her into an aviation school based in Tit Mellil, Morocco in 1950. The aviation school was reserved for the French forces occupying Morocco and little opportunity was presented to the native Moroccans, especially not women. Her enrollment was contested by the school and much was done to deter her from participating in the aviation program. As there was no legislation preventing her from enrolling, the school reluctantly accepted her application with hopes that she would soon give up.

Despite this after a year of dedicated study and determination, Chaoui obtained her aviation licence on 17 October 1951, at the age of 15. She became the first Moroccan and Maghrebi female pilot.

Assassination 
Touria Chaoui was killed on March 1, 1956, at the age of 19, while driving her younger brother from school. Her killer was identified as Ahmed Touil, the leader of a secret organisation who assassinated several Moroccan political personalities. She is buried in the Ahl Fas cemetery, in Casablanca.

References

1936 births
1956 deaths
1950s murders in Morocco
1956 crimes in Morocco
20th-century Moroccan people
20th-century Moroccan women
Women aviators
Moroccan murder victims
People from Fez, Morocco
Violence against women in Morocco